Radio Yunost (Radio Youth), also known as "You-FM" was the primary youth radio station in Russia . It currently broadcasts as a livestream online, now broadcasting Soviet music and literary performances.

History 
Radio Yunost' began broadcasting in 1962 in what was then the USSR. It was the main station, where Russian people could hear fresh foreign music. Now "Yunost" radio station, also called "You-FM" is part of the Federal State Unitary Enterprise VGTRK, which also includes television channels "Russia", "Sport", "Culture", "Vesti", and "Bibigon", as well as radio stations "Radio Rossii", "Mayak", "Culture", and "Vesti FM". The station shut down as a youth station on January 9, 2014. Radio Yunost was relaunched on January 2, 2018, as an online-only service, now playing older Russian songs and literature-based programming instead of pop and dance music.

Talk and music shows

Billboard Dance Club Play Song Top 25
Saturday evening show, hosted by Masha Haritonova, is presenting Billboard Club Chart.
Currently this show is broadcast between 18:00 msk and 20:00 msk on Saturdays.

Hip-Hop Master
Sunday late-evening show, hosted by Master Spensor, is presenting main artists and new names of Russian urban music.
Currently this show is broadcast between 00:01 msk  and 01:00 msk on the nights from Sunday to Monday.

Yuni-Hit Top 30
Friday evening show, hosted by FM Yusupov & Natasha Krylova, is presenting Main Chart of Radio Yunost.
Currently this show is broadcast between 18:00 msk and 20:00 msk on Fridays and Sundays.

DJ-hosted radio shows
Monday:
00:00-01:00 "Digital Emotions" Dj Fonar
20:00-21:00 "Panic Dance" Dj Romanov Dj MarDee 
22:00-23:00 "Clubnight" Dj Michael Haase	

Tuesday:
22:00-23:00 "Future Sounds" Dj FatCat							
23:00-24:00 "Translation" Dj Vladimir Chistyakov		

Wednesday:
22:00-23:00 "We are the Breaks" Denn Bazooka			
23:00-24:00 "Atlantica" Den Sokolov

Thursday:
22:00-23:00 "Big Room Sound" Filo & Peri		 	
23:00-24:00 "Nocturnal Sunshine" Matt Darey

Friday:
21:00-22:00 "ClubStation" Dj Darsay				
23:00-24:00 "Milk & Sugar Mix" Milk & Sugar

Saturday:
22:00-23:00 "Exxpedition" Dj Andrey Exx 
23:00-24:00 "Solid Beats" Dj Solid Sky

Sunday:
23:00-24:00 "In Stereo" Dj Chus

Broadcast
Radio Yunost is classified as a music and radioshow station for youth.  It is one of the state's channels, meant to appeal to an active youth audience.

Distribution
Radio Yunost is broadcast throughout Russia, as well as in other parts of Europe, on the LW, MW and FM bands.

Satellites
Radio Yunost is broadcast through this satellites:

 Ekspress AM3 C High DVB
 Ekspress A2 Tp 6 DVB
 Ekspress AM33 Steerable DVB
 Yamal 201 C DVB
 Ekspress MD1 C DVB
 Ekspress AM1 Tp 6 DVB

External links

Wiki article in Russia
 Radio Yunost/You-FM playlist at Moskva.fm
 Radio Yunost - 45 y.o.
 Radio Yunost 1962—1999 History
 You-FM online, archive, playlist (GMT +6)

Radio stations established in 1962
Radio stations disestablished in 2015
Radio stations established in 2018
Radio stations in Russia
Radio stations in the Soviet Union
Russian-language radio stations